This is a list of Directors of the Royal Botanic Gardens, Kew:

1759–1793      William Aiton
1793–1841      William Townsend Aiton
1841–1865      Sir William Jackson Hooker
1865–1885      Sir Joseph Dalton Hooker
1885–1905      Sir William Turner Thiselton-Dyer
1905–1922      Sir David Prain
1922–1941      Sir Arthur William Hill
1941–1943      Sir Geoffrey Evans (acting)
1943–1956      Sir Edward Salisbury
1956–1971      Sir George Taylor
1971–1976      Jack Heslop-Harrison
1976–1981       Professor John Patrick Micklethwait Brenan
1981–1988      Professor Arthur Bell
1988–1999      Sir Ghillean Prance
1999–2006      Professor Sir Peter Crane
2006–2012      Professor Stephen D. Hopper
2012–present   Richard Deverell

References

Kew, London
Royal Botanic Gardens, Kew